The Saturday Big Tent Wedding Party is the twelfth mystery novel The No. 1 Ladies' Detective Agency series  by Alexander McCall Smith and first published in 2011. The Motswana Precious Ramotswe is featured as the principal detective.

Plot summary
Precious Ramotswe is taunted by a dream in which she is driving her old white van. She discovers that her van is fixed up and running well again, so she hopes to retrieve it. Charlie is accused of getting his girlfriend pregnant with twin boys. He feels guilty and runs away. Mma Ramotswe investigates a case of rural jealousy in which cattle are being injured. Violet Sephotho runs for Botswana Parliament which is Botswana's worst nightmare.

Reviews
Muriel Dobbin found this novel to be "Mr. McCall Smith at his benevolent best."

References

The No. 1 Ladies' Detective Agency
2011 British novels
Novels by Alexander McCall Smith
Little, Brown and Company books